The Complete Works of William Shakespeare is the standard name given to any volume containing all the plays and poems of William Shakespeare. Some editions include several works that were not completely of Shakespeare's authorship (collaborative writings), such as The Two Noble Kinsmen, which was a collaboration with John Fletcher; Pericles, Prince of Tyre, the first two acts of which were likely written by George Wilkins; or Edward III, whose authorship is disputed.

Selected editions
The various editions of the Complete Works include a number of university press releases, as well as versions released from larger publishing companies. The Complete Works (especially in older editions) are often sought after by book collectors, and a number of binderies and publishing houses have produced leather bound and gilded releases for luxury book collecting.

Both mainstream and academic publishing companies have released multiple editions and versions of their own collections of Shakespeare's work, often updated periodically. Multiple editors contribute to the processes of laying out the Complete Works, and many times either the main editor, publishing company, or university's name is included in the title. (For instance, the Complete Works published by the Arden company is often referred to as the Arden Shakespeare, and the edition produced by Yale University called the Yale Shakespeare.)

Published editions 
 Arden – The Complete Works (Arden Shakespeare), The Arden Shakespeare Complete Works ("Arden Shakespeare")
 Black Dog & Leventhal – William Shakespeare: The Complete Works (4 vol.)
 CRW Publishing Ltd. – The Complete Works of William Shakespeare 
 Gramercy – William Shakespeare: The Complete Works, William Shakespeare: The Complete Works [Deluxe Edition], The Globe Illustrated Shakespeare: Complete Works, The Globe Illustrated Shakespeare: The Complete Works Annotated
 HarperCollins – The Complete Works of William Shakespeare: The Alexander Text, Complete Works of William Shakespeare (Ed. 1–4)
 Kittredge Shakespeare, The Complete Works of Shakespeare, edited by George Lyman Kittredge, Ginn & Co. 1936 (revised by Irving Ribner and reissued 1971)
 Longman – The Complete Works of Shakespeare (Ed. 1–7)
 Modern Library – William Shakespeare: Complete Works Palgrave Macmillan – The RSC Shakespeare: The Complete Works Penguin Books – World of Shakespeare: The Complete Plays and Sonnets of William Shakespeare (38 Volume Library) (38 vol.)
 Penguin Classics – The Complete Pelican Shakespeare Riverside – The Riverside Shakespeare (Ed. 1–2) ("Riverside Shakespeare")
 Wordsworth Editions Ltd. – The Complete Works of William Shakespeare, The Complete Works of William Shakespeare [Special/Royals], The Complete Works of Shakespeare [Children's Classics], Complete Works of William Shakespeare (3 vol.)

 Academic editions 
 "Cambridge Shakespeare" (Cambridge University Press, Doubleday, Garden City, Houghton Mifflin, Octopus Books, RH Value)
 "The Oxford Shakespeare"
 "Yale Shakespeare"

 See also 

 Arkangel Shakespeare The Complete Works of William Shakespeare (Abridged) – a slapstick sped-up version by the Reduced Shakespeare Company
 List of works by William Shakespeare

 References 
 The Complete Works of Shakespeare, Fifth Edition, David Bevington, ed. Longman, 2003.
 The Riverside Shakespeare'', Heather Dubrow, William T. Liston, Charles H. Shattuck, G. Blakemore Evans, Joseph Jay Tobin, Herschel Baker, Anne Barton, Frank Kermode, Harry Levin, Hallett Smith, Marie Edel, eds. Houghton Mifflin, 1997.

External links 

The Complete Works of William Shakespeare at Project Gutenberg.
The Complete Works of William Shakespeare at ollibrary.

Works by William Shakespeare
Shakespearean scholarship